The Young Memorial, also known as the War Memorial Monument, is a World War I memorial located on the campus of Hendrix College in Conway, Arkansas.  The sculpture consists of a semicircular seating area, its wings flanking a central square pedestal on which stands a carved rendition of a doughboy.  The face of the pedestal bears a relief of the Statue of Liberty, while the backs of the seats have reliefs of female figures, one representing Liberty and the other Peace.  The memorial was designed by Hendrix College Professor George Currie, and was placed in 1920.

The memorial was listed on the National Register of Historic Places in 1996.

Originally installed on the west side of Tabor Hall, the memorial has been relocated 5 times. After its 2013 restoration it was relocated to the Young-Wise Memorial Plaza where it stands near sculptures honoring two former Hendrix students who died in Afghanistan.

See also
National Register of Historic Places listings in Faulkner County, Arkansas

References

Monuments and memorials on the National Register of Historic Places in Arkansas
Neoclassical architecture in Arkansas
1920 sculptures
Buildings and structures in Conway, Arkansas
Hendrix College
World War I memorials in the United States